James Charles Wilson (24 August 1816 – 7 February 1861) was an early settler of Texas and later a state legislator.

Wilson was born in Yorkshire, England, on August 21, 1818. He immigrated to the Republic of Texas in 1836.

In 1842 he joined Charles K. Reese in the ill-fated Somervell Expedition.  Captured while serving with the company, he managed to escape on 30 July 1843.

He lived in Brazoria, Texas where he became district clerk before representing Calhoun, Jackson, Matagorda, and Wharton counties in the House of Representatives of the Third and Fourth Legislatures from 1848 to 1853.  In 1856 he became commissioner of the Court of Claims.

In addition to his legal career, Wilson also served as a Methodist minister.

He died in Gonzales on 7 February 1861.  Wilson was originally buried in Askey Cemetery near Gonzales but later was moved to the Texas State Cemetery in Austin.

Wilson County, Texas, is named in his honor.

References

External links
 
 James Charles Wilson at the Texas State Cemetery
 

1816 births
1861 deaths
Methodists from Texas
Texas state senators
People from Houston
People from Yorkshire
19th-century American politicians
Wilson County, Texas